Zoltes was a chief of the southern Thracians, living in the Haemus mountains area. Leading small groups, he often made incursions into the Pontic cities and within their territories. He attacked the city of Histria, calling off the siege only after having received 7500 drachmas and 5 talents (approx. 30000 drachmas).

Etymology 
In Baltic mythology, the grass snake (Lithuanian: žaltys, Latvian: zalktis) is seen as a sacred animal.

References 

2nd-century BC rulers in Europe
Thracian kings